The following are the national records in athletics in Palau maintained by its national athletics federation: Palau Track and Field Association (PTFA).

Outdoor

Key to tables:
 

ht = hand timing

y = denotes one mile

# = not ratified by federation

Men

†: result obtained during the octathlon.
‡: probably youth implement, because Leon Mengloi was only 17 years old.

Women

†: Ngerak Florencio was member of the North Harbour Bays Cougars team (BC or NHBC) that competed at the Northern Region National Teams Competition Qualifiers.
‡: Resident non-national (USA).

Indoor

Men

Women

References
General
World Athletics Statistic Handbook 2022: National Outdoor Records
World Athletics Statistic Handbook 2022: National Indoor Records
Specific

External links
 PTFA web site

Palau
Records
Athletics